The Jet PSL Club Rookie of the Year in South African football is awarded to the most outstanding rookie of the season.  To be considered a rookie, a player must be in his first year in the PSL. The award was established in 2001 and is sponsored by Jet.

Premier Soccer League trophies and awards
Rookie player awards